Aeron Zinga (born 15 July 2000) is a French professional footballer who plays as a forward for  club Valenciennes.

Career
Zinga made his professional debut with Orléans in a 2–0 Ligue 2 loss to Troyes on 28 February 2020.

References

External links
 
 Grenada FA Profile

Living people
2000 births
French footballers
Association football forwards
US Orléans players
RC Strasbourg Alsace players
Valenciennes FC players
Ligue 2 players
Championnat National 3 players